(La) Serna may refer to:

 La Serna, Palencia
 La Serna del Monte, in the Community of Madrid, Spain
 La Serna High School, in Whittier, California
 Serna, village development committee in Nepal
 Serna-class landing craft, a series of Russian landing craft
 Serna (surname)

See also
 La Serna del Monte, Madrid, Spain
 de la Serna
 Sernas
 Laserna